Neophylax concinnus is a species of caddisfly in the family Thremmatidae. It is found in North America.

References

External links

 

Integripalpia
Articles created by Qbugbot
Insects described in 1871